Hunka Lunka is the only studio album by Finnish folk music band Shamaani Duo, who later changed their name to Shaman, and later to Korpiklaani. This album featured the original lineup of the band, which consisted of guitarist/singer/songwriter Jonne Järvelä and singer Maaren Aikio. Aikio departed following the release of this album, and the band morphed into Shaman.

Track listing

 "Šamanát" (music by Jonne Järvelä, lyrics by Järvelä & Maaren Aikio) - 3:25 	
 "Hunka Lunka" (music by Maaren Aikio, lyrics by Niiles-Jouni Aikio) - 2:04 	
 "Moai Letne Duoddaris" (music by Järvelä, lyrics by Maaren Aikio) - 4:55 	
 "Gula Gula" (music by Mari Boine, lyrics by Järvelä, Maaren Aikio & Timo Järvinen) - 3:35 	
 "Riehču" (music & lyrics by Järvelä) - 4:50 	
 "Geahčan Dan Máilmmi" (music by Järvelä, lyrics by Maaren Aikio & Niiles-Jouni Aikio) - 4:45 	
 "Meahcis" (music by Järvelä, lyrics by Maaren Aikio) - 2:54 	
 "Mánážan" (music & lyrics by Järvelä) - 2:41 	
 "Nisson Čahppes Biktasiinnes (Lady In Black)" (music by Ken Hensley) - 2:35 	
 "Idja Dál Lea" (music by Järvelä, lyrics by Maaren Aikio) - 2:45 	
 "Okto Ijas" (music by Järvelä & Maaren Aikio, lyrics by Maaren Aikio & Niiles-Jouni Aikio) - 4:11

Personnel
 Jonne Järvelä - vocals, guitars, keyboards, bass, djembe, tambourine
 Maaren Aikio - vocals, tüngür

References

Korpiklaani albums
1996 albums